Šestani is a sub-region within Skadarska Krajina, in southernmost Montenegro. The region is a small mountain plateau of which terrace slopes towards the Skadar Lake. The region is predominantly populated by Albanians, most of whom are Muslims. 

The Arbanasi people in the Zadar region are thought to have hailed from the villages of Briska (Brisk), Šestan (Shestan), Livari (Ljare), and Podi (Pod) having settled the Zadar area in 1726–27 and 1733 on the decision of Archbishop Vicko Zmajević of Zadar, in order to repopulate the land.
The Dabovići in Dobra Voda and the Markići in Komina, both villages in Mrkojevići  came from the Albanian-speaking region of Shestan.

The region was divided into two, and in 1876, Gornji Šestani encompassed the villages of Lukići (Lukaj), Dedići (Dedaj), Marvučići (Rud),  Gurza (Gurrëzë) and Barlovići (Bardhaj), while Donji Šestani encompassed Ðuravci (Gjuraç), Karanikići (Nrekaj, Nenmal), Dračevica (Pecaj), Marstijepovići (Bujgër) and Vučedabići (Uçdabaj). In 1857, Šestani was inhabited by 579 people.

The Albanian dialect spoken in Shestan is part of the Northwestern Gheg group.

Geography 
Šestan is a sub-region and an extension of Krajina, encompassing some of the following villages and hamlets:

 Bapsulj /Babsul
 Besa / Besë
 Donja Briska / Brisk i Poshtëm
 Donji Murići / Muriq i Poshtëm
 Gornja Briska / Brisk i Nalt
 Gornji Murići / Muriq i Nalt
 Livari / Ljare
 Pinčići / Pinç
 Dedići / Dedaj
 Dračevica / Pecaj
 Gurza / Gurrëzë 
 Karanikići / Nënmal
 Lukići / Lukaj

Demographics

See also 
Albanians in Montenegro
Hotski Hum
Lower Zeta

References

External links
 Map of the region
 Oto Aksesuar
 Blog post on trip to the Sestani region including ingormation about the history of the region, villages and current status

Sources

Regions of Montenegro
Bar, Montenegro
Ulcinj
Albanian ethnographic regions